The Legion of Silence (Spanish:La legión del silencio) is a 1956 Spanish drama film directed by José María Forqué and José Antonio Nieves Conde and starring Jorge Mistral and Nani Fernández.

The film's sets were designed by Sigfrido Burmann.

Cast
 Jorge Mistral as Jean Balzac / Paul Banek  
 Nani Fernández as Dana 
 Joan Capri 
 Fernando Cebrián
 Félix Dafauce as Grumko  
 José Marco Davó as Kavenko  
 María Dolores Gispert as Ludmilla  
 Diana Mayer 
 César Ojinaga as Lucas  
 Esther Parera as Maruska  
 Nicolás D. Perchicot as Padre Orbinski  
 Rubén Rojo as Chapeck  
 Juan Manuel Soriano as Yenka  
 Jesús Tordesillas as Josef  
 Tomás Torres

References

Bibliography 
 D'Lugo, Marvin. Guide to the Cinema of Spain. Greenwood Publishing, 1997.

External links 
 

1956 drama films
Spanish drama films
1956 films
1950s Spanish-language films
Films directed by José Antonio Nieves Conde
Films directed by José María Forqué
1950s Spanish films
Spanish black-and-white films